Myriam de Lourdes Arabian Couttolenc (born 6 June 1960) is a Mexican politician affiliated with the National Action Party. As of 2014 she served as Deputy of the LIX Legislature of the Mexican Congress representing Puebla.

References

1960 births
Living people
Politicians from Puebla
Women members of the Chamber of Deputies (Mexico)
National Action Party (Mexico) politicians
Deputies of the LIX Legislature of Mexico
Members of the Chamber of Deputies (Mexico) for Puebla